Guitar Music is an album by American guitarist Leo Kottke, released in 1981. The album is all solo guitar played on a Gibson J-45 and a Lundberg-Martin 12-string.

Reception

Writing for Allmusic, music critic Chip Renner called the album "Twelve solid guitar instrumentals."

Track listing
All songs by Leo Kottke except as noted.

Side one
 "Part Two" – 1:41
 "Available Space" (Ry Cooder) – 1:34
 "Side One Suite":
 "Some Birds" – 0:59
 "Sounds Like..." – 1:28
 "Slang" – 2:42
 "My Double" – 2:05
 "Three Walls and Bars" – 2:13
 "Reprise: Some Birds" [Note: the CD cover is in error here]
 "Perforated Sleep" – 2:44

Side two
 "Strange" – 2:31
 "Little Shoes" – 1:32
 "Jib's Hat" – 2:15
 "Tumbling Tumbleweeds" (Bob Nolan) – 2:41
 "Agile N." – 1:49
 "A Song for 'The Night of the Hunter'" – 3:06
 "All I Have to Do Is Dream" (Boudleaux Bryant, Felice Bryant) – 1:42
 "Sleep Walk" (Johnny Farina, Santo Farina, Ann Farina) – 2:20

Personnel
Leo Kottke - Acoustic 6- and 12-String Guitars
Production notes:
Produced by Leo Kottke.
Recorded in Minneapolis at Sound 80, October and December 1980.
Engineers: Scott Rivard, Paul Martinson.
Thanks to Jeff Roberts and Tom Mudge.
Art Director: John Van Hamersveld
Photo: Nick Rozsa.

References

External links
 Leo Kottke's official site
 Unofficial Leo Kottke web site (fan site)

1981 albums
Leo Kottke albums
Chrysalis Records albums